Healing railway station serves the village of Healing in North East Lincolnshire, England. It was opened on 1 April 1881 by the Manchester, Sheffield and Lincolnshire Railway. The station, and all trains serving it, are operated by East Midlands Railway.

Service
All services at Healing are operated by East Midlands Railway using Class 156 DMUs.

There is a Sunday service of four trains per day in each direction during the summer months only. There are no winter Sunday services at the station.

Services were previously operated by Northern Trains but transferred to East Midlands Railway as part of the May 2021 timetable changes.

References

External links

Railway stations in the Borough of North East Lincolnshire
DfT Category F2 stations
Former Great Central Railway stations
Railway stations in Great Britain opened in 1881
Railway stations served by East Midlands Railway
Former Northern franchise railway stations